"True Love Ways" is a song attributed to Norman Petty and Buddy Holly. Buddy Holly's original was recorded with the Dick Jacobs Orchestra in October 1958, four months before the singer's death. It was first released on the posthumous album The Buddy Holly Story, Vol. 2 (Coral 57326/757326), in March 1960. The song was first released as a single in Britain in May 1960, reaching number 25 on the UK Singles Chart. It was released the following month in the US, but did not make the charts. In 1988, a UK re-release of the recording by MCA, the single reached no. 65 on the UK singles chart in a 5 week chart run.

In 1965, Peter and Gordon's version became a hit internationally, reaching number 2 in the UK, number 14 in the US Billboard Hot 100 and the top 10 in numerous other countries.

Other notable covers include Mickey Gilley's 1980 version which reached number 1 on the US Billboard Hot Country Singles chart and Cliff Richard's version that reached the top 10 in the UK and Ireland in 1983 and was a minor hit internationally.

Buddy Holly original

Background and Recording
The song was recorded at Holly's last recording session before his death on February 3, 1959. The session took place at the Pythian Temple on October 21, 1958 and also included the recordings of "It Doesn't Matter Anymore", "Raining in My Heart", and "Moondreams".

In the extended version of the song, in the first ten seconds Holly can be heard preparing to sing. The audio starts with audio saying "Yeah, we're rolling." A piano player and a tenor saxophone player play some notes, and Holly mutters, "Okay," and clears his throat. The producer yells, "Quiet, boys!" to everyone else in the room, and at the end of the talkback, the producer says, "Pitch, Ernie", to signal the piano player to give Holly his starting note, a B-flat.

Holly biographer Bill Griggs points out that the melody borrows heavily from the gospel song "I'll Be All Right," a favorite of Holly's, and one that would be played at his funeral in 1959. According to Griggs, the framework of the melody was written by Buddy, with the remainder, and lyrics, added by Petty.

Holly's widow, Maria Elena Holly, claimed that the song was written for her as a wedding gift. On April 29, 2011, Mrs. Holly unveiled the never-before-seen "True Love Ways" photo of their wedding kiss, now displayed at P.J. Clarke's above Table 53, the table where they became engaged while on their first date, on June 20, 1958.

A listing of producer Norman Petty's productions claims that Vi Petty, Norman's wife, recorded the first version of this song on June 4, 1958—two weeks prior to Buddy's engagement with Maria. However, only white label promotional copies were pressed (in July).

Personnel
Al Caiola – guitar
Sanford Block – bass
Ernie Hayes – piano
Doris Johnson – harp
Abraham Richman – saxophone
Clifford Leeman – drums
Sylvan Shulman, Leo Kruczek, Leonard Posner, Irving Spice, Ray Free, Herbert Bourne, Julius Held and Paul Winter – violins
David Schwartz, Howard Kay – violas
Maurice Brown, Maurice Bialkin – cellos

Releases 
UK: "True Love Ways" b/w "Moondreams" (Coral Q72397, 20 May 1960).
USA: "True Love Ways" b/w "That Makes It Tough" (Coral C62210, June 29, 1960).

Two compilation albums by Buddy Holly have used the title of the song. The 1989 Telstar album reached no. 8 on the UK album chart. The 2018 Decca album with the Royal Philharmonic Orchestra reached no. 10 on the UK album chart.

Chart performance

Peter and Gordon version
British pop duo, Peter and Gordon, released their version in 1965. It reached number 2 in the UK Singles Chart and is the only version of the song to have made the Top 40 of the US singles charts, reaching number 14 on the Billboard Hot 100 chart in June 1965 during the British Invasion era.  Cash Box described it as "a pretty, lyrical emotion-packed reading of the Buddy Holly-penned oldie."

Chart performance

Note, Canadian chart weeks following the song's climb up to number 3 on the Canadian chart are missing in the archive, so the song may have climbed higher.

Mickey Gilley version

Mickey Gilley, country singer, released a successful cover version in 1980 (during the height of his popularity). Gilley's version reached the No. 1 spot on the Billboard magazine Hot Country Singles chart in July 1980.

Chart performance

Year-end charts

Cliff Richard version

British pop singer Cliff Richard released his cover as the lead single from his Dressed for the Occasion album in April 1983. The recording is of a live performance at the Royal Albert Hall in 1982 with the London Philharmonic Orchestra. Richard's version reached No. 8 on the UK Singles Chart and was a hit in several other countries.

Chart performance

Other notable versions

 Vi Petty, wife of co-writer Norman Petty, and pianist on many Petty productions, is believed to have recorded the first version in June, 1958, with, initially, only limited promotional pressings made.
 Dick Rivers, a French singer, recorded a French adaptation, "Ne pleure pas" (1965). It reached number 19 in Belgium's Wallonia (French) charts and 43 in France.
 David Essex and Catherine Zeta-Jones recorded a duet for Essex's 1994 album Back to Back. The single reached no. 38 on the UK singles chart.
 Ricky Nelson recorded the song in 1985, five days before his death in a plane crash. It was his last recording before his death, although the recording remains unreleased. However, an earlier recording from 1978 is widely available.

Popular culture
 The Never Say No to Panda series of commercials for the product Panda Cheese, from the Egyptian company Arab Dairy, uses the Buddy Holly & The Picks version of the song as the theme tune of its unpredictable and destructive panda mascot. The commercials featuring the song became an instant hit on the internet and become an internet meme.

References

1958 songs
1960 singles
1980 singles
Buddy Holly songs
Bobby Vee songs
Peter and Gordon songs
Mickey Gilley songs
Cliff Richard songs
Johnny Mathis songs
David Essex songs
The Mavericks songs
Martina McBride songs
Jackson Browne songs
Songs written by Buddy Holly
Songs written by Norman Petty
Song recordings produced by Jim Ed Norman
Songs released posthumously
Epic Records singles
Coral Records singles
EMI Records singles
1950s ballads